This is a list of the municipalities in the state of São Paulo (SP), located in the Southeast Region of Brazil.

São Paulo is divided into 645 municipalities, which are grouped into 63 microregions, which are grouped into 15 mesoregions.

List

See also
Geography of Brazil
List of cities in Brazil
List of municipalities in the state of São Paulo by population

Sao Paulo

Municipalities